Lake of the Crags is located in Grand Teton National Park, in the U. S. state of Wyoming. Situated at the head of  Hanging Canyon, the Lake of the Crags is flanked by Mount Saint John to the northwest, Rock of Ages to the southwest and Symmetry Spire to the southeast.

References

Lakes of Grand Teton National Park